Corbiere v Canada (Minister of Indian and Northern Affairs) [1999] 2 S.C.R. 203,  is a leading case from the Supreme Court of Canada where the Court expanded the scope of applicable grounds upon which a section 15(1) Charter claim can be based.  This was also the first case to use the framework proposed by Law v. Canada.

Background 
Members of the Batchewana Indian Band, on behalf of themselves and all other non-resident members of the band, sought a declaration that section 77(1) of the Indian Act violates section 15(1) of the Charter. The section of the Indian Act states that only band members "ordinary resident" on the reserve be permitted in order to vote in the band elections even though only one third of the registered members live on the reserve.

Court's ruling 
The court unanimously agreed with the Court of Appeal's ruling that the Act violated section 15(1) of the Charter. However, the Court was split 5 to 4 on the proper application of the test.

The majority opinion was written by McLachlin and Bastarache JJ. with Lamer C.J., Major, and Cory JJ. concurring.

The Court found that an analogous ground upon which a section 15 claim can be based must be immutable, either actually immutable, such as race, or constructively immutable such as religion.  Furthermore, once a ground is identified as analogous it remains analogous for all circumstances.

The minority opinion was given by L'Heureux-Dubé with Gonthier, Iacobucci and Binnie JJ. concurring.

See also
 List of Supreme Court of Canada cases (Lamer Court)
The Canadian Crown and First Nations, Inuit and Métis
 Canadian Aboriginal case law
Numbered Treaties
Indian Act
Section Thirty-five of the Constitution Act, 1982
Indian Health Transfer Policy (Canada)

External links
 
 Centre for Constitutional Studies: Corbiere v. Canada

Canadian Aboriginal case law
Supreme Court of Canada cases
section 15
1999 in Canadian case law